The Filmfare Critics Award for Best Actress is given by Filmfare as part of its annual Filmfare Awards for Hindi–language films.

Superlatives 
 2 actresses have won the award in consecutive years; in chronological order, they are Manisha Koirala (1996–97) and Tabu (2000–01).
 There have been only 2 ties in 2003 and 2020. In 2003, Manisha Koirala and Rani Mukerji were both given the award for Company and Saathiya. In 2020, Taapsee Pannu & Bhumi Pednekar won this award for the same film, Saand Ki Aankh (2019).
 Neena Gupta is the eldest recipient, winning the award for Badhaai Ho (2018) at age 59. 
 Zaira Wasim is the youngest recipient, winning the award for Secret Superstar (2017) at age 17.
 9 actresses have won awards in both Best Actress and Best Actress (Critics) categories; in chronological order, they are Dimple Kapadia, Karisma Kapoor, Rani Mukerji, Kareena Kapoor, Vidya Balan, Priyanka Chopra, Kangana Ranaut, Alia Bhatt and Taapsee Pannu.
 Rani Mukerji is the only actress to win both Best Actress (Critics) and Popular awards during the same year (2006) for Black.
 9 actresses have won the award without receiving a Best Actress nomination. In chronological order they are: Farida Jalal for Mammo (1995), Manisha Koirala for Bombay (1996) & Company (2003), Shefali Shah for Satya (1999), Kareena Kapoor for Dev (2005), Tabu for Cheeni Kum (2008), Shahana Goswami for Rock On!! (2009), Mahi Gill for Dev.D (2010), Richa Chadda for Gangs of Wasseypur (2013) and Shilpa Shukla for B.A. Pass (2014). Among these, Shah, Goswami and Chadda were nominated for Best Supporting Actress.

Multiple Winners 
 4 Wins: Tabu
 3 Wins: Manisha Koirala
 2 Wins: Rani Mukerji, Kareena Kapoor, Vidya Balan

List of winners

Filmfare Critics Award for Best Performance
(From 1991 until 1997, there was one special category known as the Critics Award for Best Performance, and was awarded without prior nomination to acknowledge an actor of either sex.)

1990s
 1991 Awarded to a male actor
 1992 Not Awarded
 1993 Dimple Kapadia as Shanichari – Rudaali
 1994 Awarded to a male actor
 1995 Farida Jalal as Mammo – Mammo
 1996 Manisha Koirala as Shaila Banu – Bombay
 1997 Manisha Koirala as Annie Braganza  – Khamoshi: The Musical

Filmfare Critics Award for Best Actress
(The category is officially divided into two separate categories to acknowledge both male and female actors individually.)
 1998 Tabu as Gehna – Virasat
 1999 Shefali Shah as Pyari Mhatre – Satya

2000s
 2000 Tabu as Panna – Hu Tu Tu
 2001 Tabu as Aditi Pandit – Astitva
 2002 Karisma Kapoor as Zubeidaa Suleiman Seth – Zubeidaa
 2003 Manisha Koirala as Saroja – Company (tied with) Rani Mukerji as Suhani Sharma – Saathiya
 2004 Urmila Matondkar as Swati – Bhoot
 2005 Kareena Kapoor as Aaliya – Dev
 2006 Rani Mukerji as Michelle McNally – Black
 2007 Kareena Kapoor as Dolly Mishra – Omkara
 2008 Tabu as Nina Verma – Cheeni Kum
 2009 Shahana Goswami as Debbie Mascarenhas – Rock On!!

2010s
 2010 Mahi Gill as Parminder 'Paro' – Dev.D
 2011 Vidya Balan as Krishna Verma – Ishqiya
 2012 Priyanka Chopra as Susanna Anna–Marie Johannes – 7 Khoon Maaf
 2013 Richa Chadda as Nagma Khatun – Gangs of Wasseypur
 2014 Shilpa Shukla as Sarika – B.A. Pass
 2015 Alia Bhatt as Veera Tripathi – Highway
 2016 Kangana Ranaut Tanuja Trivedi and Kumari Kusum Sangwan – Tanu Weds Manu Returns
 2017 Sonam Kapoor as Neerja Bhanot – Neerja
 2018 Zaira Wasim as Insia Malik – Secret Superstar
Kangana Ranaut – Rangoon as Julia
Sridevi – Mom as Devki Sabarwal
Swara Bhaskar – Anaarkali of Aarah'''' as Anaarkali
Vidya Balan – Tumhari Sulu as Sulochana Dubey
 2019 Neena Gupta as Priyamvada Kaushik – Badhaai Ho 
Anushka Sharma – Sui Dhaaga as Mamta Sharma
Alia Bhatt – Raazi as Sehmat Khan
Radhika Madan – Pataakha as Champa 'Badki' Kumari 
Taapsee Pannu – Mulk as Aarti Malhotra / Mohammed
Tabu – Andhadhun as Simi

2020s

 2020 Taapsee Pannu & Bhumi Pednekar – Saand Ki Aankh as Prakashi Tomar & Chandro Tomar
 Bhumi Pednekar – Sonchiriya as Indumati Tomar
 Kangana Ranaut – Judgementall Hai Kya as Bobby
 Radhika Madan – Mard Ko Dard Nahi Hota as Supriya 'Supri'
 Sanya Malhotra – Photograph as Miloni Shah
 2021 Tillotama Shome – Sir as Ratna
 Bhumi Pednekar – Dolly Kitty Aur Woh Chamakte Sitare as Kajal "Kitty" Yadav
 Konkona Sen Sharma – Dolly Kitty Aur Woh Chamakte Sitare as Radha "Dolly" Yadav
 Sanya Malhotra – Ludo as Shruti Choksi
 Taapsee Pannu – Thappad as Amrita Sabharwal
 Vidya Balan – Shakuntala Devi as Shakuntala Devi
2022 Vidya Balan – Sherni as Vidya Vincent
 Supriya Pathak – Ramprasad Ki Tehrvi as Amma
 Taapsee Pannu – Haseen Dilruba as Rani Kashyap

See also
Filmfare Awards
Bollywood
Cinema of India

References

External links
 Filmfare Nominees and Winners

Actress, Critics